The 2015 Copa Petrobrás de Marcas season will be the fifth season of the Brasileiro de Marcas. It will begin at Goiânia in March, and will end at Interlagos in December. In 2015 Brasileiro de Marcas will be integrated at Stock Car Brasil events, with only the last round at Interlagos being held as a stand-alone event.

On 18 December 2014, Renault announced their return to Brazilian motorsport with four Renault Fluences being run by two official teams. After one win in three seasons, Mitsubishi will not return in 2015.

Teams and drivers
All drivers were Brazilian registered, except for Odair dos Santos, who ran under Paraguayan racing license and Ayman Darwich who ran under Egyptian racing license.

Race calendar and results
All races were held in Brazil.

References

External links
  

Marcas
Brasileiro de Marcas seasons